June Lake can refer to:

Canada
June Lake (Mackenzie Mountains), a lake in the Sekwi Range, Canada and site of several Elliptocephala species
June Lake (Vancouver Island), a lake on British Columbia's Vancouver Island, Canada

United States
June Lake (Sharp County, Arkansas), a lake in Sharp County, Arkansas
June Lake, California, a village in Mono County, U.S.
June Lake (California), a lake next to the village, U.S.
June Lake (Washington), a lake in the Alpine Lakes Wilderness, Washington, U.S.
June Lake, lakes in Wisconsin in Iron County and Lincoln County
June Lake, a lake in Marinette County, Wisconsin

Other uses
June Lake, a character in the 1938 American Western film The Frontiersmen

See also
June Lake Junction, California, an unincorporated community in Mono County